This list covers satellites built and/or operated by entities in the Philippines – by private firms based in the Philippines or by the Philippine government. The first Philippine satellites were operated by private companies. The first Filipino-owned satellite is Agila-1, a satellite acquired in 1996 by Mabuhay Satellite Corporation from PT Pasifik Satelit Nusantara, an Indonesian company. The first Philippine satellite launched to space was Agila-2 which was placed to orbit in 1997.

The Philippine Space Agency is the lead government organization of the Philippine space program since 2019 but all active satellites are built and operated by the Department of Science and Technology (DOST) and its child agencies. The DOST was behind Diwata-1 which was launched to space in 2016 and was the first satellite built and designed by Filipinos and Maya-1 was the first nano-satellite owned by the Philippines and was launched in 2018. Additional Maya satellites were developed and launched in cooperation with JAXA under the Birds program (official name: Joint Global Multi Nation Birds) with the Kyushu Institute of Technology.

The Philippines presently does not have orbital launch capability, and has historically relied on other nations' space programs to launch their satellites into orbit.

List

References

Lists of satellites
Satellites
Satellites